Fleury Michon was a 75-foot waterline length trimaran that was sailed across the Atlantic ocean in 1987.

See also
List of multihulls
Fleury Michon IV

References

Trimarans
1980s sailing yachts
Route du Rhum yachts